John Lewis-Stempel (born 1967) is an English farmer, writer, and Sunday Times Top 5 best selling author. He was born in Herefordshire, where his family have lived for over 700 years.

Career
He has written on a range of subjects from Native Americans to fatherhood, but specialises in military history and natural history under his family name. He is a former columnist for The Sunday Express (for which he still writes features), and currently a columnist for Country Life and The Times. His column on nature and farming in Country Life won him Magazine Columnist of the Year in the 2016 BSME Awards. His new monthly column in The Countryman magazine will begin in March 2023. 

Lewis-Stempel's book Meadowland: The Private Life of an English Field won the Thwaites Wainwright Prize and was also short-listed for BBC Countryfile Country Book of the Year 2014. In 2016 The Running Hare was a BBC Radio 4 Book of the Week and a Sunday Times best seller, and was shortlisted for the 2017 Wainwright Prize, The Richard Jefferies Society Prize and the Independent Bookshop Week Book Award. He won the 2017 Wainwright Prize with another shortlisted book, Where Poppies Blow, about British soldiers and their relationship with nature in World War I. The Spectator has described him as 'the hottest nature writer around', and The Times as 'Britain's finest living nature writer'. The Wood: The Life and Times of Cockshutt Wood, released in 2018, was also a Radio 4 Book of the Week, and Sunday Times top five bestseller. His history of farming in England, Woodston, published in 2021, also became a Sunday Times bestseller.

Awards
Society of Authors Foundation Award (2012.)
Thwaites Wainwright Prize (2015)
BSME Awards Magazine Columnist of the Year (SI/B) (2016)
Gambrinus 'Giuseppe Mazozotti' Literary Prize (2016) commended
Thwaites Wainwright Prize (2017)
 Professional Publishers Association Columnist of the Year (2018) shortlisted

Bibliography
 Fatherhood: An Anthology (2001)
 England: The Autobiography (2005)
 The Autobiography of the British Soldier: From Agincourt to Basra, in His Own Words (2007)
 The Wild Life: A Year of Living on Wild Food (2010)
 Young Herriot: The Early Life and Times of James Herriot (2011)
 Six Weeks: The Short and Gallant Life of the British Officer in the First World War: The Life and Death of the British Officer in the First World War (2011)
 Young James Herriot: The Making of the World's Most Famous Vet (2012)
 Foraging, The essential guide to wild food (2012)
 The War Behind the Wire: The Life, Death and Glory of British Prisoners of War, 1914–18 (2014)
 Meadowland: The Private Life of an English Field (2014)
 A Brief History of the British Army (with Jock Haswell) (2016)
 The Running Hare: The Secret Life of Farmland (2016)
 Where Poppies Blow: The British Soldier, Nature, The Great War (2016)
 The Secret Life of the Owl (2017)
 The Wood: The Life and Times of Cockshutt Wood (2018)
 The Glorious Life of the Oak (2018)
 Still Water: The Deep Life of the Pond (2019)
 Woodston (2021)    
 The Soaring Life of the Lark (2021) 
 The Shepherd's Tale (2022)

Personal life

Lewis-Stempel lives on a farm in Herefordshire with his wife and two children.

References

External links
 https://web.archive.org/web/20120315055111/http://www.lawagency.co.uk/?page=writers&sub_page=specific&writers_id=82&filer=2
 https://www.theguardian.com/books/video/2009/may/23/hay-festival-john-lewis-stempel
 https://www.theguardian.com/books/2011/nov/08/paperback-q-a-john-lewis-stempel
http://www.countryfile.com/awards2014-15.
http://www.bsme.com/shortlist-2016-bsme-awards

British historians
British male writers
Living people
People from Herefordshire
British biographers
1967 births
English nature writers